Santiago Gómez may refer to:

Santiago Gómez Cou (1903–1984), Uruguayan-Argentine actor. 
Santiago Gómez Cora (born 1978), retired Argentine rugby player.

Gómez, Santiago